Hatim al-Tai (Hatim of the Tayyi tribe; died 578), full name Ḥātim bin ʿAbd Allāh bin Saʿd aṭ-Ṭāʾyyī was the ruling prince and poet of the Tayyi tribe of Arabia. Stories about his extreme generosity have made him an icon among Arabs up until today, as evident in the proverbial phrase "more generous than Hatim". Additionally, he is known to be a model of Arab manliness. The tales of Hatim are also popular in North India and Pakistan, where he is known as Hatimtai (हातिमताई).

His son was Adi ibn Hatim, who was a companion of the Islamic prophet Muhammad.

Biography 

Al-Tai lived in Ha'il in the present-day Saudi Arabia and was mentioned in some hadiths attributed to Muhammad. He died in 578 AD and was buried in Tuwarin, Ha'il. His tomb is described in the Arabian Nights. His name ‘Hatim’ means “black crow” in Arabic.

He lived in the sixth century CE and also figures in the Arabian Nights stories. The celebrated Persian poet Saadi, in his work Gulistan (1259 CE) wrote:
"Hatim Taï no longer exists but his exalted name will remain famous for virtue to eternity. Distribute the tithe of your wealth in alms; for when the husbandman lops off the exuberant branches from the vine, it produces an increase of grapes". He is also mentioned in Saadi's Bostan (1257). According to legends in various books and stories, he was a famous personality in the region of Ta'i (present day Ha'il) and is also a well-known figure in the rest of the Middle East as well as the Indian subcontinent, featuring in many books, films and TV series in Arabic, Persian, Urdu, Turkish, Hindi, Kashmiri and various other languages.

Rozat-ul-Sufa mentions that "In the eighth year after the birth of his eminence the Prophet (Muhammad), died Noushirwan the Just, and Hatemtai the generous, both famous for their virtues", around 579 CE. According to the 17th-century orientalist D'Herbelot, his tomb was located at a small village called Anwarz, in Arabia.

Works 

Poems:
 On Avarice by Hatem Taiy

Qissa-e-Hatem-tai 

Qissa-e-Hatem-tai, alternatively Dastan-e-Hatem-tai, meaning "The Tale of Hatemtai" is very popular in the Indian subcontinent. Multiple films (see below) have been made about Hatim based on this story, which narrates seven of his fantastic adventures in seven chapters.

The books on the story usually consist of a short introduction describing his ancestry and character and tells the seven episodes based on seven riddles, asked by a beautiful and rich woman named Husn Banu, who will marry only the person who is able to obtain answers to all seven of them. The riddles are:
'What I saw once, I long for a second time.'
'Do good, and cast it upon the waters.'
'Do no evil; if you do, such shall you meet with.'
'He who speaks the truth is always tranquil.'
'Let him bring an account of the mountain of Nida.'
'Let him produce a pearl of the size of a duck's egg.'
'Let him bring an account of the bath of Badgard.'

A king, who falls in love with her but unable to find answers, tells the generous Hatemtai, whom he meets by chance, all about it. Hatim undertakes the quest to find the answers and help the king marry her.

Films
 Hatimtai, a 1929 Indian film
 Hatimtai, a 1933 Indian film
 Hatimtai, a 1947 Indian film
 Hatimtai Ki Beti, a 1955 Indian film
 Sakhi Hatim, a 1955 Indian film
 Hatim Tai (1956), directed by Homi Wadia
 Shan-E-Hatim, a 1958 Indian film
 Son of Hatimtai, a 1965 Indian film
 Saat Sawal (1971), directed by Babubhai Mistry
 Hatim Tai (1990), directed by Babubhai Mistry

TV series 
 Dastaan-e-Hatimtai - An Indian TV Series aired on DD National.
 Hatim - An Indian TV Series on Star Plus in 2003-04
 The Adventures of Hatim - A 2013 Indian TV Series on Life OK

See also 
 Ka'b Ibn Mama

References

Further reading 
  The Story of Hatim in The Arabian Nights (AD 800–900 in modern form).
 The Adventures of Hatim Tai (Qissa-e-Hatim Tai, from an 1824 Persian manuscript) by Duncan Forbes.
 Adventures of the second Darwesh in Bagh-o-Bahar or Qissa Chahar Darvesh, Mir Amman of Delhi, Urdu 1804, translated by  Duncan Forbes 
 Edward FitzGerald (1809–1883) mentions Hatim Tai in his translations of the Rubaiyat of Omar Khayyam. See quatrain IX in Fitzgerald's first edition:
   "But come with old Khayyam, and leave the Lot
    Of Kaikobad and Kaikhosru forgot:
      Let Rustum lay about him as he will,
    Or Hatem Taiy cry Supper--heed them not."
 Many books written and translated in Arabic, Persian, Urdu, Hindi etc.
 Hatem Tai in Tamil by Prema Pirasuram

External links 
 

578 deaths
One Thousand and One Nights characters
Year of birth unknown
Tayy
6th-century Arabic poets
Yemeni poets